Soheil Arghandewall (born 19 August 2001) is a German professional footballer who plays as a midfielder for Swiss club YF Juventus.

Career statistics

References

2001 births
Sportspeople from Münster
Footballers from North Rhine-Westphalia
Living people
German footballers
Association football midfielders
SC Preußen Münster players
FC Zürich players
SC Young Fellows Juventus players
Swiss Super League players
Swiss Promotion League players
German expatriate footballers
German expatriate sportspeople in Switzerland
Expatriate footballers in Switzerland
21st-century German people